Bob Humid (also known as Robert Feuchtl) is a producer, DJ, sound-designer and mastering-engineer in the Cologne electronic music and studio-scene. His musical work expands from electronic breakbeats to experimental electronica while occasionally touching the area of club music and pop. He describes his own music as "Eclectica".

He was  born in Montevideo, Uruguay, but grew up in Germany for most of the time. He was one third of the Electronic Body Music / Synthpop-Formation "Der Liederkranz" in the late 1980s and early 1990s. He has organised and co-organised many activities in Cologne's electronic music underground including "Mos Eisley" (with DJ Tetsuo), "Twist'n'Shout" (with Uh-Young Kim), "Is It Now?", "Radical Love Area", "Vectrax" (with Telekolleck), "Propellor Knights", "Lights! Lights!" and "BASScadets" (with Snork and Dan_K). He has also run the two record labels named Bored Beyond Belief (1995–along with Wolfgang Schreck from Big Noise fame) and Serve & Destroy Recordings, the latter being his own label platform. Currently he is one of the resident-DJs of "Ehrenfeld Calling", a colognian monthly event featuring both breakbeat and techno-orientated music.

Bob Humid was also the technological editor for the German Groove Magazine for almost six years as a successor to Christian Rindermann (aka C-Rock). He gained reputation in the German Keyboards / Sound & Recording Magazine where he worked as a technological author as well. Along testing studio and DJ gear he is a producer with an affinity for detail. Over the years he has gained a growing reputation as a dedicated mastering engineer. Under the credit of his own studio "Fat Of Excellence", which he runs together with Numinos, he mastered countless records for Boxer Sport, Mathias Schaffhaeuser's Ware Records, Pagoda London, Plasteline, Audiolith, Patrick Alavi, Kitbuilders, Dan Curtin, Plemo, Der Tante Renate, Bratze and many other independent labels and artists. His work also includes sound design for various companies such as Native Instruments, Magix (Samplitude, Sequoia) and U-He (Satin). His more recent works are productions for the highly acclaimed Leipzig-based band Brockdorff Klang Labor for whom he produced half of the tracks of the album "Die Fälschung der Welt", along with one of Germany's most known producers for alternative music, Tobias Levin.

Over the time, Bob Humid has worked, produced, and remixed with such people and groups as: twila.too, Carla Subito (Fetisch Park), Holger Czukay (Can), Fabian Stall (Zero Cash), Oliver Twist Kooperationen, Brockdorff Klanglabor, Igor Sirodzha, Daniel Myer (Dots And Dashes, Haujobb), Bernhard Deissler (Videos), Alexander Gerdes, Numinos, Coloma, Mathew Mercer, Carlsbop, Der Liederkranz, Decomposed Subsonic (aka Valour), Uh-Young Kim, Telekolleck (British Botschaft), Peter Licht, Djamel Laroussi and Mathias Schaffhäuser (Ware Records).

Album Releases

Twisted Repairs (Serve & Destroy / Groove Attack) – 2001

His debut twin-album release Twisted Repairs (see also "Twisted Despairs") draws a sharp line between the musical styles of labels such as Rephlex and Certificate 18. It features elements of IDM, Techstep, Drum'n'Bass and some vocal production. It also features sophisticated beat-programming and a unique editing where every sound has a meaningful feel to it. Bob Humid has an obsession for Funk within 4/4th metrics and a digital production philosophy that he claims to be influenced a lot by Rupert Hine in his early 1980s phase . It can be noted that it is one of the first electronic works that feature object-oriented editing, a feature only available in the Digital Audio Workstation Samplitude back in 2001. While being distributed worldwide by Groove Attack, both debut albums have been solely promoted in Germany, where they have been highly acclaimed by the local press.

Twisted Despairs (Serve & Destroy / Groove Attack) – 2001

This album can be considered the "Evil Twin-Brother" of "Twisted Repairs". It is the effort of the artist to perform a remixed variation of his own work in Twisted Repairs. Bob Humid intended to make "Twisted Despairs" sound as if the original album would have been remixed in a far away future and brought to present times by mysterious ways of time-travel. Therefore, it leaves the paths of abstract Drum'n'Bass behind, while serving a wild and eclectical mix of electronic genres, heavily covered under a lot of DSP-Processing and hundreds of layers of effects and filtering-techniques. It extensively features sounds generated with Coagula, an Image Synthesizer programmed by Rasmus Ekman.

Second Wind Phenomenon (Suburban Trash / Serve & Destroy) – 2006

Five years after his debut album "Twisted Repairs" Bob Humid has changed his look at Electronic Music. "Second Wind Phenomenon" is a mature musical oeuvre that combines elements of Soundtrack, Science-Fiction, Psychedelia, IDM, Drill'n'Bass and Radioplays. Being a real concept-album, inspired a lot by the way Bands like Godley & Creme, The Legendary Pink Dots or Coil (band) produced their albums, it is very diverse and eclectical while slightly touching all kind of musical styles. The production defines the limits of what is possible in modern music-production as up to date. It features binaural microphoning-techniques and a lot of unusual vocal production. Along the participants we find the names of Holger Czukay (Can), Igor Sirodzha, Coloma, twila.too and Carla Subito (Fetisch Park). The CD Extra-Zone of the CD-version (a double-vinyl version is available) contains a XviD-version of "Angst", a 16mm short-movie by filmmaker Alexander Gerdes for whom Bob Humid has written the soundtrack and score. The idea of the album-artwork was strongly inspired by the psychedelia-art of Heinz Edelmann who was responsible for the pop-art-look in Yellow Submarine (film).

Notes
Interview for his work as a sound-designer and sound-mixer in film for Magix Magazine [6]

Interview for the German Keyboards Magazine 09/2002 by Bernhard Loesner 

Interview for FRIEDMYLITTLEBRAIN-Magazine in 2013 by Damian B

References

External links
 Actual interview (2013) at FRIEDMYLITTLEBRAIN
 Comprehensive discography at Discogs
 Sound-Design & Soundtrack für the experimental short-movie "Angst" by Alexander Gerdes
 Contact, Blog, music, tourdates and news
  Studio-Website

Musicians from Montevideo
German electronic musicians
German people of Uruguayan descent
Living people
1970 births
Uruguayan people of German descent
Uruguayan expatriates in Germany